Katse Botanical Gardens is a centre for Alpine flora in Katse village, Lesotho.

The gardens were created as a result of plant rescue missions to mitigate the impact of the Katse Dam, particularly spiral aloes. The collection has a focus on traditional Sotho medicinal plants and has a large seed bank.

At an altitude of 2229 meters it claims to be the highest botanical garden in the southern hemisphere.

See also

 Botanic Gardens Conservation International
 Treborth Botanic Garden, twinned with Katse Botanical Gardens

References

External links
 UNEP Dams and Development Project

Environment of Lesotho
Botanical gardens in Lesotho